The Ministry of Disaster Management and Refugee Affairs (MIDIMAR;) is a department of the Government of Rwanda, responsible for disaster management and refugee affairs. The incumbent minister is Marcel Gatsinzi, who took office on 12 April 2010. Its head office is in the Blue Star House in Kacyiru, Kigali.

References

External links

Ministry of Disaster Management and Refugee Affairs

Disaster Management and Refugee Affairs